Dutch Landrace ('Netherlands Landrace') may refer any of at least the following breeds of livestock from the Netherlands:

 Dutch Landrace goat, a breed of goat
 Dutch Landrace pig, a breed of pig